USS Dawn is a name used more than once by the United States Navy, and may refer to:

 , a steamer in commission from 1861 to 1865 that saw service during the American Civil War
 , a repair boat in commission from 1917 to 1918
 , the proposed naval designation for a private yawl ordered delivered to the Navy in 1917 but never commissioned into Navy service
 , a tanker in commission from 1944 to 1946

United States Navy ship names